The jocotoco antpitta (Grallaria ridgelyi) is an endangered antpitta, a bird from Ecuador and Peru.  It was discovered in 1997, and scientifically described in 1999.

Description
The jocotoco antpitta is a large (150–200 g) antpitta with a striking head pattern showing tufts of white plumes beneath the eyes.  It has a song similar to the hooting of the rufous-banded owl.

Taxonomy
Its closest relatives appear to be the chestnut-naped antpitta and the pale-billed antpitta, with which it forms a group of antpittas with uniform breast plumage and smoky-grey flanks.

This bird's specific name honors the ornithologist Robert S. Ridgely, who took part in the initial discovery of this species.  The common name refers to the local name of the bird, jocotoco, which is onomatopoetic after its hooting calls and song.

Distribution and habitat
The antpitta is known only from a very small number of locations in southeastern Ecuador and adjacent Peru, and appears to be declining. It was believed to be limited to the upper Chinchipe River drainage in Zamora-Chinchipe, Ecuador, but in 2006 a population was discovered in Cordillera del Cóndor in Cajamarca, Peru.  It inhabits only wet, mossy forest with ample Chusquea bamboo stands and silvery-leaved Cecropia trees. It is found at altitudes of 2,250 to 2,700 meters.

Conservation and status
To protect the presumably small population, the Tapichalaca Biological Reserve was established on behalf of Fundación de Conservación Jocotoco in 1998.

The IUCN classifies it as endangered (B1ab(i, ii, iii, v)). This means that based on available data, it is estimated to occur in no more than five locations over a total area of less than 5000 km², with both habitat quality and availability, and numbers declining, and some of the subpopulations in danger of disappearance. Owing to its shyness and the call, which might be mistaken for that of a rufous-banded owl, it could be more widespread than now known, although surveys at several seemingly appropriate localities have failed to find any evidence of it.

References

External links
BirdLife International: Jocotoco Antpitta Grallaria ridgelyi Species Factsheet. Retrieved 11 February 2020.
World Land Trust: Jocotoco Antpitta Grallaria ridgelyi. Retrieved 2007-FEB-22.

jocotoco antpitta
Birds of the Ecuadorian Andes
Birds of the Peruvian Andes
jocotoco antpitta
jocotoco antpitta
Endangered animals